Carlos Sánchez (born 22 August 1990) is a Honduran professional footballer who plays as a defender for Honduran club C.D. Olimpia and the Honduras national team.  He has won one league title with C.D. Honduras Progreso.

Honduras national team
Sánchez was called to take part in the 2017 CONCACAF Gold Cup

Honours and achievements

Honduras Progreso
 Liga Nacional:
 Winners (1): 2015–16 A
 Runners-up (1): 2016–17 C

Motagua
 Liga Nacional:
 Winners (2): 2018–19 A, 2018–19 C
 CONCACAF League
 Runners-up (1): 2018

References

External links
 
 

1990 births
Living people
Honduras international footballers
Honduran footballers
People from Yoro Department
Association football defenders
Liga Nacional de Fútbol Profesional de Honduras players
Platense F.C. players
C.D. Marathón players
C.D. Honduras Progreso players
Real C.D. España players
F.C. Motagua players
2017 CONCACAF Gold Cup players